Asterix at the Olympic Games is an adventure sports video game for the Wii, Xbox 360, PlayStation 2, Microsoft Windows and Nintendo DS developed by Étranges Libellules and published by Atari Europe. It is loosely based on the comic with the same name and mostly based on the live action film. It was released in Europe on 9 November 2007 for the Windows, Wii, PlayStation 2 and Nintendo DS, followed by the UK release on 29 February 2008. The game also released on Xbox 360 in 2008.

Plot
Astérix and Obélix have to win the Olympic Games in order to help their lovesick friend Lovestorix marry Princess Irina. Brutus uses every trick in the book to have his own team win the game, and get rid of his father Julius Caesar in the process.

Gameplay
While letting the players to switch control between both Asterix and Obelix anytime, the action is split between platforming in 3D through the city and competing in challenges to unlock new areas. Players can throw the javelin and hammer, participate in the long jump, running events, and various other Olympic events (in Wii's case, by using the controller). Besides the main Story mode, there is also the Antique mode, which gives a freedom of selecting any Olympic event and playing it right away.

References

2007 video games
3D platform games
Atari games
Étranges Libellules games
Multiplayer and single-player video games
Nintendo DS games
PlayStation 2 games
Video games based on adaptations
Video games based on Asterix
Video games based on films
Video games developed in France
Video games set in France
Video games set in Greece
Wii games
Windows games
Xbox 360 games